Roller sports was an event in the Asian Games for the first time in 2010, when the games were held in Guangzhou, China.

Events

Artistic skating

Inline freestyle skating

Skateboarding

Speed skating road

Speed skating track

Medal table

Participating nations

List of medalists

References

Roller Sports Results Book

External links 
Roller sports at the ocasia.org

 
Sports at the Asian Games
Asian Games